Anaene is a genus of moths in the subfamily Arctiinae. The genus was erected by Harrison Gray Dyar Jr. in 1914.

Species
 Anaene diagramma Dyar, 1914
 Anaene improspersa Dyar, 1914
 Anaene spurca Dyar, 1914
 Anaene squalida Dyar, 1914

References

Lithosiini
Moth genera